The George Macdonald Medal is awarded jointly between Royal Society of Tropical Medicine and Hygiene and the London School of Hygiene & Tropical Medicine "to recognise outstanding contributions to tropical hygiene". 

The award was established in 1972 following the death of George Macdonald in 1967.

It is awarded every 3 years and is awarded to "those in their mid career or senior leaders in their field".

Recipients 
Source: RSTMH

 2020 Alex Ezeh and Sarah Cleaveland
 2017 Ann Ashworth and Betty Kirkwood
 2014 Richard Hayes and Rosanna Peeling
 2011 David Mabey and Robert Snow
 2008 Sandy Cairncross
 2005 Allen Foster
 2002 Anthony Harries
 1999 Andrew M. Tomkins
 1996 David J. Bradley
 1996 Christopher F. Curtis
 1993 Tore Godal
 1990 Michael P. Alpers and C. E. Gordon Smith
 1987 Kelsey A. Harrison
 1984 Arnoldo Gabaldon
 1984 John Waterlow
 1981 Peter Jordan
 1978 Leonard J. Bruce-Chwatt
 1975 Donald A. Henderson
 1972 George Davidson

References 

London School of Hygiene & Tropical Medicine
Royal Society of Tropical Medicine and Hygiene
Medicine awards